Dokkoida?!, known in Japan as  is a comedic Japanese light novel series about a boy, who is hired by a preteen space alien girl, Tanpopo, to try out an experimental new suit developed by the intergalactic toy company that she works for. Suzuo agrees to work for her since he is unemployed and needs the job to pay the rent. The suit gives him super powers, with which he fights bad guys and people from rival intergalactic toy companies and organizations.

The novels were written by Taro Achi, with illustrations by Yu Yagami. The novels were adapted into a three-volume manga series with the same name, by the same authors and published by Dengeki Bunko, and an anime series, directed by Hitoyuki Matsui and Takuya Nonaka, produced by Ufotable, and aired by Mainichi Broadcasting System.

The Dokkoida anime was licensed by Geneon Entertainment for Region 1 distribution, and the manga adaptation was licensed by DC Comics under the CMX imprint; the original light novel series has not been licensed for distribution in North America. The anime series is now licensed by Sentai Filmworks and is currently streaming on HIDIVE.

Episodes

References

Further reading

External links
 Official website 
 American release
 

1999 Japanese novels
2000 manga
2003 anime television series debuts
Anime and manga based on light novels
ASCII Media Works manga
Kadokawa Dwango franchises
CMX (comics) titles
Dengeki Bunko
Dengeki Comic Gao!
Geneon USA
Light novels
Television shows based on light novels
Science fiction anime and manga
Sentai Filmworks
Shōnen manga
Ufotable
Mainichi Broadcasting System original programming